Callionymus pleurostictus, the blue-spotted ruddertail dragonet, is a species of dragonet native to the Pacific Ocean where it is found from the Ryukyus south to Australia. This species grows to a length of  SL.

References

External links
 

P
Fish described in 1982